Auguste Albert was a French sailor who competed in the 1900 Summer Olympics.

He was a crew member of the French boat Martha 1, which won a silver and a bronze medal in the races of the 1 to 2 ton class. He also participated in the Open class with the boat Martha 27, but did not finish the race.

Further reading

References

External links

French male sailors (sport)
Sailors at the 1900 Summer Olympics – 1 to 2 ton
Sailors at the 1900 Summer Olympics – Open class
Olympic sailors of France
Olympic silver medalists for France
Olympic bronze medalists for France
Year of birth missing
Year of death missing
Place of birth missing